Hesket is the name of several locations:

Hesket, Cumbria, a civil parish in the United Kingdom
Hesket, Victoria, a locality in Australia

Etymology
For its etymology see Hesketh (disambiguation)#Etymology.